Rural Police is a South Korean reality show broadcast on MBC every1, where celebrities join small police centres in the countryside to experience their work as an amateur police officer. Four seasons of the show aired from July 2017 to December 2018, with each season filmed in a different locale in South Korea. Two spin-offs were also produced: Sea Police, which features the Korea Coast Guard, and Urban Cops, which follows police departments based in the city.

The first two seasons were filmed in small "Security Centres" serving townships that encompass several villages, while the later two seasons were filmed in larger police substations serving relatively more populated geographical areas such as towns. The filming locations are:

 Season 1: Yongdam-myeon (Jinan-gun, North Jeolla-do)
 Season 2: Munsu-myeon (Yeongju, North Gyeongsang-do)
 Season 3: Heunghae-eup (Buk-gu, Pohang, North Gyeongsang-do) and Ulleungdo
 Season 4: Sindong-eup (Jeongseon-gun, Gangwon-do)

In each location, the cast act in the capacity of an entry-level police officer, with the police centre's experienced police officers mentoring them in their duties.

Cast

Main cast

Police officers

List of episodes

Season 1

Season 2

Season 3

Season 4

Notes

References

External links 

 Season 1 website (in Korean)
 Season 2 website (in Korean)
 Season 3 website (in Korean)
 Season 4 website (in Korean)

South Korean reality television series
Korean-language television shows
2017 South Korean television series debuts
MBC TV original programming